Mori Atas, also known as Upper Mori or West Mori, is an Austronesian language of the Celebic branch.  The traditional Mori Atas homeland is the upper course of the Laa River in Central Sulawesi.

Classification 
Mori Atas is classified as a member of the Bungku-Tolaki group of languages, and shares its closest affinities with the Padoe language.  Together, Mori Atas and Mori Bawah are sometimes referred to collectively by the cover term Mori.

Dialects 
Mori Atas presents a complicated dialect situation.  Following Esser, five dialects can be regarded as principal.
 Molio’a
 Ulu’uwoi
 Tambee
 Molongkuni
 Impo

Notes 

Bungku–Tolaki languages
Languages of Sulawesi